China competed at the 2018 Summer Youth Olympics, in Buenos Aires, Argentina from 6 October to 18 October 2018.

Medals

Medals awarded to participants of mixed-NOC (combined) teams are represented in italics. These medals are not counted towards the individual NOC medal tally.

Archery

China qualified two archers based on its performance at the 2017 World Archery Youth Championships.

Individual

Team

Athletics

Boys
Track and road events

Field events

Girls
Track and road events

Field events

Badminton

China qualified three players based on the Badminton Junior World Rankings.

Individual

Team

Basketball

China qualified a boys' and girls' team based on the U18 3x3 National Federation Ranking.

 Boys' tournament – 1 team of 4 athletes
 Tianyi Chu
 Jiwang Guo
 Zipeng Wang
 Wang Yunzhang
  Girls' tournament – 1 team of 4 athletes
 Ding Kangche
 Zhang Rui
 Han Xu
 Hao Zheng

Beach volleyball

China qualified a girls' team based on its performance at the 2018 Asian U19 Championship.

 Girls' tournament – 1 team of 2 athletes

Canoeing

China qualified one boat based on its performance at the 2018 World Qualification Event.

 Boys' K1 – 1 boat

Boys

Cycling

China qualified a girls' combined team based on its ranking in the Youth Olympic Games Junior Nation Rankings.

 Girls' combined team – 1 team of 2 athletes

Dancesport

China qualified one dancer based on its performance at the 2018 World Youth Breaking Championship.

 B-Boys – X-Rain

Diving

Fencing

China qualified five athletes based on its performance at the 2018 Cadet World Championship.

 Boys' Épée – Li Zhiwel
 Boys' Foil – Xu Jie
 Boys' Sabre – Zhou Xuyi
 Girls' Foil – Fu Yingying
 Girls' Sabre – Lin Kesi

Field Hockey 

China qualified a girls' team (9 athletes) to the tournament.

Roster

 Wenquian Cai
 Ruirui Cao
 Yunxia Fan
 Yangyan Gu
 Ning Ma
 Anhui Yu
 Heyang Zhang
 Xinyi Zhu
 Meirong Zou

 Preliminary round

Quarterfinals

Semifinals

Bronze medal game

Golf

Individual

Team

Gymnastics

Acrobatic
China qualified a mixed pair based on its performance at the 2018 Acrobatic Gymnastics World Championship.

 Mixed pair – 1 team of 2 athletes (not used)

Artistic
China qualified two gymnasts based on its performance at the 2018 Asian Junior Championship.

 Boys' artistic individual all-around – 1 quota
 Girls' artistic individual all-around – 1 quota

Boys

Girls

Rhythmic
China qualified one gymnast based on its performance at the 2018 Asian Junior Championship.

 Girls' rhythmic individual all-around – 1 quota

Trampoline
China qualified two gymnasts based on its performance at the 2018 Asian Junior Championship.

 Boys' trampoline – 1 quota
 Girls' trampoline – 1 quota

Multidiscipline

Modern pentathlon

China qualified two pentathletes based on its performance at the Asian/Oceanian Youth Olympic Games Qualifier. China also qualified another female pentathlete based on its performance at the 2018 Youth A World Championship. They must decide which quota they will use.

 Boys' Individual – Zhao Zhonghao
 Girls' Individual – Yuan Xin or Gu Yewen

Roller speed skating

China qualified one roller skater based on its performance at the 2018 Roller Speed Skating World Championship.

 Boys' combined speed event – Chen Tao

Rowing

China qualified one boat based on its performance at the Asian Qualification Regatta and another boat based on its performance at the 2017 World Championships.

 Boys' single sculls – 1 athlete
 Girls' pair – 2 athletes

Sailing

China qualified two boats based on its performance at the 2018 Singapore Open (Asian Techno 293+ Qualifiers). China later qualified two IKA Twin Tip boats based on its performance at the 2018 IKA Twin Tip Racing Youth World Championship.

 Boys' Techno 293+ – 1 boat
 Boys' IKA Twin Tip Racing – 1 boat
 Girls' Techno 293+ – 1 boat
 Girls' IKA Twin Tip Racing – 1 boat

Shooting

China qualified three sport shooters based on its performance at the 2017 Asian Championships.

Individual

Team

Sport climbing

China qualified three sport climbers based on its performance at the 2017 World Youth Sport Climbing Championships.

 Boys' combined – 2 quotas (Pan Yu Fei, Huang Di Chong)
 Girls' combined – 1 quota (Song Yi Ling)

However, Song was not included on the final start list for the Youth Olympics.

Swimming

Boys

Girls

Mixed

Table tennis

China qualified two athletes based on its performance at the Asian Qualification Event.

 Boys' singles – Wang Chuqin
 Girls' singles – Sun Yingsha

Taekwondo

Tennis

Singles

Doubles

Triathlon

China qualified two athletes based on its performance at the 2018 Asian Youth Olympic Games Qualifier.

 Boys' individual – 1 quota (not used)
 Girls' individual – 1 quota
Individual

Relay

Weightlifting

China qualified four athletes based on its performance at the 2017 World Youth Championships.

 Boys' events – 2 quotas (not used)
 Girls' events – 2 quotas (not used)

Wrestling

Key:
  – Victory by Fall
  – Without any points scored by the opponent
  – With point(s) scored by the opponent
  – Without any points scored by the opponent
  – With point(s) scored by the opponent

References

2018 in Chinese sport
Nations at the 2018 Summer Youth Olympics
China at the Youth Olympics